You Are God is a 2012 Polish biography film directed by Leszek Dawid. It is the story of Polish hip-hop group Paktofonika.

The film premiered at the 2012 Gdynia Film Festival.

Cast 
 Marcin Kowalczyk as Magik
 Dawid Ogrodnik as Rahim
 Tomasz Schuchardt as Fokus
 Arkadiusz Jakubik as Gustaw Zarzycki
  as Justyna Luszcz
 Marcin Dorociński as Manager
  as Magik's father
  as Magik's mother
  as Magda

References

External links 
 

2012 films
Biographical films about musicians
2010s hip hop films
Cultural depictions of Polish men
Cultural depictions of hip hop musicians
Films set in Poland
Films shot in Poland
2010s biographical films
2010s musical films
Polish biographical films
Polish musical films